is a Japanese free announcer, tarento, and television presenter. He is a former Nippon TV announcer. He is currently represented with Take Off. He is nicknamed  by Tatsunori Hara.

Filmography

TV series

Current appearances

One-shot appearances

Former appearances

As Nippon TV announcer

As free announcer

TV drama

Anime

Films

Anime films

Music videos

Magazines

Discography

Videography

References

External links
 - 

Japanese television presenters
Japanese television personalities
Japanese sports announcers
Waseda University alumni
People from Ageo, Saitama
1971 births
Living people